Geronay Michaela Whitebooi (born 2 January 1996) is a South African judoka. She is a silver medalist at the 2019 African Games and a four-time medalist, including two golds, at the African Judo Championships.

She represented South Africa at the 2020 Summer Olympics in Tokyo, Japan. She competed in the women's 48 kg event. Whitebooi won the gold medal in the 2022 Commonwealth Games in the women's 48kg category.

Achievements

References

External links
 
 

Living people
Place of birth missing (living people)
South African female judoka
African Games medalists in judo
African Games silver medalists for South Africa
Competitors at the 2019 African Games
Judoka at the 2020 Summer Olympics
Olympic judoka of South Africa
Commonwealth Games gold medallists for South Africa
Commonwealth Games medallists in judo
Judoka at the 2022 Commonwealth Games
1996 births
21st-century South African women
Medallists at the 2022 Commonwealth Games